Megan Jones (née Hess, born 1988) is an American politician from Iowa. Jones is a Republican member of Iowa House of Representatives from District 6 and has been a Representative since 2013.

Early life 
In 1988, Jones was born as Megan Hess in Harlan, Iowa. In 2005, Jones graduated from Spencer High School.

Education 
Jones earned a bachelor's degree in Law, Politics, and Society from Drake University in Des Moines, Iowa. In 2011, Jones earned her JD degree from William Mitchell College of Law in Saint Paul, Minnesota.

Career 
In 2005, while Jones was in high school, she was a page for Representative Clel Baudler. While Jones was attended college, she was a clerk for Clel Baudler.

Jones is an attorney with Hemphill Law Office.

On November 6, 2012, Jones won the election and became a Republican member of Iowa House of Representatives for District 2. Jones defeated Steve Bomgaars, a teacher from her high school, with 56.5% of the votes.
On November 4, 2014, as an incumbent, Jones won the election and continued serving District 2. Jones defeated Terry Manwarren and write-in candidates with 86.9% of the votes. At age 26 in 2013, Jones was one of the three youngest legislators. As a mother with a baby, she was working as a legislator who also brought her baby to work.

On November 8, 2016, as an incumbent, Jones won the election, and continued serving District 2. Jones ran an unopposed election.

On November 6, 2018, as an incumbent, Jones won the election, and continued serving District 2. Jones defeated Ryan Odor with 66.0% of the votes.

Committee assignments 
, Jones serves on the following committees in the Iowa House.
 Environmental Protection (chair)
 Judiciary
 Local Government
 Agriculture and Natural Resources Appropriations Subcommittee
 Administrative Rules Review Committee

She has endorsed Florida Senator Marco Rubio for President of the United States.

Electoral history

Personal life 
In 2014, Jones married Will Jones, a farmer. They have two child, Anchor Jones and Alma Jones (born January 2018). Jones and her family live in Sioux Rapids, Iowa.

References

External links 

 Representative Megan Jones official Iowa General Assembly site
 
 Financial information (state office) at the National Institute for Money in State Politics
 Megan Jones at Iowaschoolfinance.com
 Megan Hess 2012 Winner of The 45 Most Adored Republican Women Under 45
 Megan Lee Hess Jones at vote-ia.org
 Megan Jones at spencersignal.com

Year of birth missing (living people)
Drake University alumni
Republican Party members of the Iowa House of Representatives
Living people
People from Spencer, Iowa
Women state legislators in Iowa
People from Harlan, Iowa
21st-century American politicians
21st-century American women politicians
1988 births